Siler is an unincorporated community in Knox County, Kentucky, United States.

References

Unincorporated communities in Knox County, Kentucky
Unincorporated communities in Kentucky